The 1987 State of Origin series saw the sixth time the annual three-match series between the New South Wales and Queensland representative rugby league football teams was contested entirely under 'State of Origin' selection rules. It saw the emergence of new faces who would go on to become Origin legends (Queensland's Allan Langer and New South Wales' Andrew Ettingshausen), record crowds for all three matches, and an additional exhibition game played in Long Beach, California (near Los Angeles).

The 1987 series was also the last in which players for Queensland were selected from teams of the Brisbane Rugby League premiership. With the introduction of the Brisbane and Gold Coast clubs to the New South Wales Rugby League premiership the following year, after this series all players in State of Origin would be sourced from NSWRL teams. The final five BRL players selected for Queensland were captain Wally Lewis, Gene Miles, Allan Langer, Colin Scott and Greg Conescu, all of whom joined the Brisbane Broncos in 1988.

Games

Game I
Mark Murray had missed just one Origin clash in the first five series but when he suffered a serious eye injury that forced his premature retirement in the off-season of 1986, it was widely expected that in-form Eastern Suburbs half-back Laurie Spina would be called into the side after good form for the Roosters and impressing in a Qld selection trial at Lang Park. Instead, and against the wishes of coach Wayne Bennett, the Maroons selectors opted for the jockey-sized Ipswich Jets half-back Allan Langer then just 68 kg and a month shy of his 21st birthday. Spina would never again get the chance to represent Queensland.

In his first match at Origin level, Langer proved he was a worthy partner for Wally Lewis in the halves and silenced his doubters with a performance that went close to earning him the man-of-the-match award which was won by Blues' second rower Les Davidson.

With only minutes left in the game the scores were locked at 16-all and heading for the first drawn result when referee Mick Stone made one of the best refereeing decisions in Origin history under immense pressure in front of a rabid Queensland crowd. New South Wales' half-back Peter Sterling missed with a field-goal attempt before launching a final backline raid down the right hand side of the field. Cronulla Sharks centre Andrew Ettingshausen, on debut and playing on the wing, sent his club team-mate Mark McGaw away on a long burst down the sideline. Cornered by the converging defence, McGaw threw an inside pass that was knocked down by Queensland but was kicked ahead into the Maroon's in-goal. In a flurry of action that saw arms, legs and bodies flailing in desperation, a hand reached out and grounded the ball just before it skidded dead.

Referee Stone was forced to make a split second pivotal decision without the help of the video referee backup of today's game. Stone ruled that McGaw had touched down centimetres inside the dead-ball line for a try, despite the protests of the Qld players and the 33,000 strong Lang Park crowd yelling for him to call in their favour and prevent the Maroons from losing their 7th game from the past 8 contests. While video replays ultimately proved inconclusive, leaving the decision a controversial one still debated among many today, Stone was adamant that the try had been scored and later confirmed that had there not been a try scored, he would have awarded a penalty try to NSW in any case as Qld centre Peter Jackson had attempted to hold back McGaw by grabbing his jumper.

Game II

Game II at the Sydney Cricket Ground in front of a record Origin crowd of 42,048 was played in torrential rain. The powerful kicking of Lewis and fullback Gary Belcher was superior to the Blues' who were forced to play much of the match in their own half. Queensland capitalised on New South Wales' errors  to emerge with a 12-6 victory. On his 27th birthday, Peter Sterling earned the man-of-the-match award, a rare honour for a player on the losing side.

Before the game, and despite Queensland having won Origin from 1980–84, as New South Wales had won the 1985 and 1986 series and 7 of the previous 8 games going into game 2 (dating back to Game 3 in 1984), and with the addition of the Brisbane Broncos and Gold Coast Seagulls into the Sydney premiership in 1988, some in the Sydney press were wondering about the future of Origin with the general feeling being that the Blues were set to embark on another period of domination like the one that had brought about the Origin concept in the first place. Queensland's gutsy win under pressure and in adverse conditions silenced the critics.

Game III

The series decider at Lang Park was a classic Origin knife's-edge encounter that swung from one end of the field to the other. Queensland scored two brilliantly conceived tries to lead 10-8 at halftime and defied the Blues in a scoreless second half of incredible tension. After referee Barry Gomersall ruled New South Wales centre Michael O'Connor offside from a Cliff Lyons kick (though television replays showed it was line-ball), Queensland winger Dale Shearer kicked a penalty goal in the 39th minute, giving the Maroons a two-point win and the Series. Langer was a triumphant figure for Queensland and in his third Origin game was named 'man of the match' after playing the game of his life.

Exhibition match
Later in the season an exhibition match was played at Long Beach, California. The game did not count toward the series, but the match retained State of Origin status and is included in the records and player appearance calculations.

It was billed as an historic occasion for the game and an opportunity for rugby league to grab a foothold in the United States. It was a bold endeavour, but ultimately the match failed to create the barest ripple on America's sporting consciousness. There was minimal press coverage of the game and disputes over whether a 12,500 crowd or less (some estimates say 7,000) were in attendance, with many tickets given away free.

Teams

New South Wales

Queensland

References

Sources
 Big League's 25 Years of Origin Collectors' Edition, News Magazines, Surry Hills, Sydney

External links
State of Origin 1987 at rugbyleagueproject.org

State of Origin series
State of Origin series
Sports in Long Beach, California
Rugby league in California
Rugby league in the United States
State